William Wilbur was an American politician from New York.

He lived in Genoa, New York.

He was a member of the New York State Assembly (Cayuga Co.) in 1836 and 1837.

Sources
The New York Civil List compiled by Franklin Benjamin Hough (pages 217, 219 and 316; Weed, Parsons and Co., 1858)

Year of birth missing
Year of death missing
Democratic Party members of the New York State Assembly
People from Genoa, New York